Underworld is the second studio album by French progressive/neoclassical metal band Adagio, released in 2003. It is the last by the band to feature David Readman on vocals and Dirk Bruinenberg on drums.

Track listing

Personnel 
Stéphan Forté – guitar
David Readman – vocals
Kevin Codfert – keyboard
Franck Hermanny – bass
Dirk Bruinenberg – drums
Dennis Ward – producer
with

Rose Hreidmarr of Anorexia Nervosa – guest vocals on tracks 4 and 7

Charts

References 

2003 albums
Albums produced by Dennis Ward (musician)
Adagio (band) albums